Television in Hungary was introduced in 1957. Transmission in colour was introduced to Hungarian television for the first time in 1971. Hungary had only one television channel until 1973. It was only in the mid 1990s when private and commercial broadcasting was introduced to Hungary.

Hungarian programming

Utca 13 

 11.22.63
 Against the Wall
 Aquarius
 Boston Legal
 Burke’s Law
 Burn Notice
 Cold Case
 Columbo
 Coma
 Criminal Minds: Beyond Borders
 CSI: Crime Scene Investigation
 Do No Harm
 Dig
 Fairly Legal
 El còncession, algéno de murdère.
 Flashpoint
 Hawaii Five-0
 HawthoRNe
 Haven
 House, M.D.
 Imposters
 Intelligence
 Kojak
 Law & Order
 Law & Order: Criminal Intent
 Law & Order: Los Angeles
 Law & Order: Special Victims Unit
 Law & Order: Trial by Jury
 Lost
 MacGyver
 Major Crimes
 Midsomer Murders
 Miss Marple
 NYC 22
 NYPD Blue
 Perception
 Poirot
 Psych
 The Rockford Files
 Rookie Blue
 Rosewood
 Scandal
 Star Trek: Enterprise
 Stargate Universe
 Suits
 The A-Team
 The Closer
 The Event
 The Good Wife
 The Mentalist
 The Mysteries of Laura
 The Player
 Third Watch
 Walker, Texas Ranger
 Women’s Murder Club

Universal Channel Hungary 
 Being Erica
 Blue Bloods
 Brothers & Sisters
 Covert Affairs
 Diagnosis: Murder
 ER
 Fact or Faked: Paranormal Files
 Foyle’s War 
 The Good Wife
 The Guardian
 Hawaii Five-0
 Haven
 Law & Order
 Law & Order: Criminal Intent
 Law & Order: Special Victims Unit
 Legends
 The Librarians
 McLeod’s Daughters
 Medium
 Midsomer Murders
 Monk
 Nash Bridges
 Perception
 Psych
 The Real Housewives of Orange County 
 Republic of Doyle
 Rookie Blue
 Royal Pains
 Scandal
 Sea Patrol
 Shattered
 Three Rivers
 Walker, Texas Ranger
 Who Do You Think You Are?

Free-to-air television channels broadcasting in Hungary

Free-to-air on DVB-T

Free-to-air on analogue 
Analogue broadcasting in Hungary was phased out in two phases that were completed on July 31 and October 31, 2013, respectively. 
However, analogue broadcasting is still active as of August 2021 in the Balaton area, at least.

 M1
 TV2
 RTL
 plus Local channels

Free-to-air on satellite
 M1
 M2
 Duna
 Duna World
 M4 Sport 
 M5
 Galaxy4
 Story4
 TV4

Hungarian channels by groups

Duna Média (MTVA) 
 DUNA: 0-24: National main channel of Hungary, since March 15, 2015. Started in 1992. Available in HD.
 M1: 0-24: News channel, since March 15, 2015. It was the national main channel before, started in 1957. Available in HD.
 M2 / M2 Petőfi: 6-20: Kids channel since December 22, 2012, 20-6: Entertainment since March 15, 2015. Started in 1973. Available in HD.
 M3: 0-24: Retro channel started in late 2013. closed in 2019, available only on internet as m3.hu Available in HD.
 M4 Sport: 0-24: Sport channel started in 2015. Available in HD.
 M4 Sport+ Sports channel, weekends on Duna World  from 14h to 22h. 
 M5: 0-24: Started on August 6, 2016 as sport channel, (also called M5 Sport) because of the Rio Olympics 2016 and Rio Paralympics 2016, as cultural channel since September 18, 2016. (It was planned as a regional channel.) Available in HD.
 Duna World: International channel of Hungary, since April 16, 2006. Available in HD.
 M6: Planned as a regional channel. MTVA doesn't plan to launch it in the following years.
 M3D: In the summer of 2012 it was the 3D channel of MTVA.
 M4K: Planned as a 4K channel.

RTL Magyarország (RTL Group) 
 RTL: The most popular commercial channel in Hungary.
 Cool, Film+, RTL Kettő, RTL Három, Sorozat+, RTL Gold: premium series' and films' channels 
 Muzsika TV: Hungarian music
Channels in bold are available in HD.

TV2 Group 
 TV2: One of main commercial channel in Hungary.
 TV2 Séf, FEM3, Jocky TV, Moziverzum, TV2 Comedy, Izaura TV, TV2 Kids, PRIME,  Mozi+, Super TV2, Spiler1 TV, Spiler2 TV: premium series', films' and sport channels
 Zenebutik: Hungarian music
Channels in bold are available in HD.

National Channels 
 Duna: Main national channel, started broadcasting on 24 December 1992 (Free-to-air on DVB-T).
 Duna World: International channel, started broadcasting on 16 April 2006 (Free-to-air on DVB-T).
 M1: News channel since 15 March 2015, started broadcasting on 1 May 1957 (Free-to-air on DVB-T).
 M2: Kids channel between 6:00 am and 8:00 pm since 22 December 2012, M2 Petőfi between 8:00 pm and 6:00 am on 15 March 2015, started broadcasting in 7 November 1973 (Free-to-air on DVB-T).
 M3: Entertainment channel, started broadcasting on 20 December 2013, closed as a TV channel on 1 May 2019 (Free-to-air on DVB-T).
 M4 Sport:  Sports channel, started broadcasting on 18 July 2015. (Free-to-air on DVB-T).
 M4 Sport+: Sports channel, started broadcasting on weekends in place of Duna World between 2:00 pm and  10:00 pm on 12 September 2020.
 M5: Cultural channel since 18 September 2016, started broadcasting as a sports channel from 5 August to 18 September 2016 (due to the 2016 Summer Olympics and 2016 Summer Paralympics in Rio de Janeiro, Free-to-air on DVB-T).

National commercial channels 
 TV2: Main channel, started broadcasting on 4 October 1997 (Free-to-air on DVB-T).
 RTL: Main channel, started test broadcasting as RTL Klub on 7 October 1997 and officially on 27 October 1997 (Free-to-air on DVB-T).

National commercial premium channels 
 Super TV2 (Also available on DVB-T2)
 RTL Kettő (Also available on DVB-T2)

Cable channels

General and entertainment

News and politics

Sport

Movies

Series and telenovellas

Documentary

Animals

Travel and lifestyle

Culinary

Children & families

Music

Religion

Regional

Adult

HD TV-Channels

Planned

Defunct or renamed 
 Paramount Channel renamed as Paramount Network
 RTL Spike renamed as Teen Nick
 FilmBox Plus  renamed as FilmBox Stars
 Fine Living
 Discovery Showcase HD 
 History2 only in Hungary
 LiChi TV  renamed as TV2 Séf
 KiWI TV  renamed as TV2 Kids
 Humor+ renamed as TV2 Comedy
 Viasat Nature/History HD
 Megamax
 ID Xtra
 C8
 FOX
 Sport M
 Chili TV renamed as Lichi TV
 Story 4 renamed as TV4
 Story 5 renamed as Story4
 Galaxy renamed as Galaxy4
 Echo TV
 DoQ
 Romance TV only in Hungary
 VIVA Hungary replaced by Comedy Central Family Hungary
 Comedy Central Extra 
 M3 Anno only as m3.hu (webTV)
 Digi Film renamed as FilmNOW
 Disney Junior
 Ozone Network renamed as OzoneTV
 Life Network renamed as LifeTV
 Film+2 renamed as RTL Gold
 AXN White replaced by Sony Max
 AXN Black replaced by Sony Movie Channel
 Universal Channel 
 PRO4 renamed as Mozi+
 Cartoon Network Too
 Animax
 Discovery World renamed as DTX
 BBC Knowledge renamed as BBC Earth
 TV3
 Prizma TV renamed as RTL+
 Reflektor TV
 AXN Sci-Fi renamed as AXN Black
 AXN Crime renamed as AXN White
 Hallmark channel renamed as Universal Channel
 Kids co.
 Zone Club
 Írisz TV
 MTVA Info
 M3D
 A+
 Avante
 Best Of Music
 Budapest Európa Televízió
 Cherry Music
 Szív TV
 MSat
 Club TV
 Discovery Civilisation renamed as Discovery World 
 Discovery Travel and Living
 Fény TV
 FilmBox Extra
 FilmBox Extra1
 FilmNet
 Fox Kids renamed as Jetix
 Galaxia TV
 Game One TV
 Hálózat TV
 HungaroSport
 Humor 1 merged with M+ to form Cool TV
 Jetix renamed as Disney Channel
 Joker TV
 Karma TV
 Meteo TV
 MGM
 MusicPlus Hungary
 MTV Hungary
 Movies 24
 Nóta TV renamed as Sláger TV
 PV TV
 Rock TV
 Top TV HU
 Top Shop TV
 SATeLIT Televízió
 Sport Klub+
 SuperOne Music
 Ötös csatrona
 MusicMix
 MusicMix SuperOne
 TCM
 Cartoonito
 Agro TV Hungary
 M3
 Antenna3 Hungary
 Nautik Hungary
 TV deko renamed as Spektrum Home 
 Filmmúzeum renamed as Film Mania
 Musicmax
 Musicmax Adult
 Private Spice
 Zone Club
 Zone Reality renamed as CBS Reality
 Zone Europa 
 Zone Romantica renamed as Film Cafe
 ZENIT TV HUNGARY
 SportKlub Hungary
 P+ Televízió
 BBC Entertainment
 TV2 Classic
 Digi Sport renamed as Match4

Rating shares

By channel 
The channels with the largest viewing share in 2016 are:

By television group

Historical rankings

See also 
 List of Hungarian-language television channels
 Media of Hungary

References